The Fokker V.4 was a prototype German fighter aircraft of World War I. Inspired by the successful Sopwith Triplane, Anthony Fokker chose to create a triplane fighter. Reinhold Platz was responsible for the design. The V.4 looked very much like the later Dr.I, but is easily recognized by the lack of interplane struts. All three wings were cantilever and the lower two wings had the same span. The rudder was balanced, but the ailerons and elevators lacked horn balances.

In the past, this aircraft was given the V.3 designation in error. Aero Historian Peter M. Grosz finally corrected the error while researching Fokker fighter developments.

The V.4 was eventually fitted with V.5 wings and sent to Austria-Hungary for evaluation.

Bibliography

1910s German fighter aircraft
V.04
Single-engined tractor aircraft
Triplanes
Rotary-engined aircraft
Aircraft first flown in 1917